Landzaat is a Dutch surname. Notable people with the surname include:

 Andre Landzaat, Dutch actor
 Denny Landzaat, Dutch footballer
 Willem Pieter Landzaat, Dutch war hero, recipient of the Military William Order

Fictional characters:
 Faldio Landzaat, character in the Valkyria Chronicles series
 Karl Landzaat, character in the Valkyria Chronicles series

Dutch-language surnames